Oboronia liberiana, the Liberian ginger white, is a butterfly in the family Lycaenidae. It is found in Liberia, Ivory Coast and Ghana. The habitat consists of wetter forests.

Adults are attracted to the flowers of the larval host plant.

The larvae feed on Costus afer.

References

Butterflies described in 1950
Polyommatini
Butterflies of Africa